Kenneth Otto Eikenberry (born June 29, 1932) is an American lawyer and politician.

Eikenberry was Washington's Attorney General from 1981 to 1993.  A Republican, he succeeded Slade Gorton, who went on to represent Washington in the United States Senate.  Eikenberry ran for governor of Washington in 1992, and was defeated narrowly by Democrat Mike Lowry.  Eikenberry is currently on the board of the Constitutional Law PAC.

Eikenberry was a 3-term elected member of the Washington State House of Representatives, 36th District, from 1971 through 1977.  He also served as the elected Chairman of the Washington State Republican Party 1977 to June, 1980, and again from 1993 through 1996.

He endorsed Clint Didier for the Senate in the 2010 midterm elections.

Recently he has been seen on TV in Washington urging a "NO" vote on the Washington Initiative 522, 2012 on labeling of genetically-engineered foods.

References

External links
 

|-

1932 births
Living people
State political party chairs of Washington (state)
Republican Party members of the Washington House of Representatives
Washington (state) Attorneys General